The 2012 Colorado Ice season was the team's sixth season as a football franchise and fourth in the Indoor Football League (IFL). Founded for the 2007 season as part of United Indoor Football, the Colorado Ice became charter members of the IFL when the UIF merged with the Intense Football League before the 2009 season. One of 16 teams that competed in the IFL for the 2012 season, the Fort Collins-based Colorado Ice were members of the Intense Conference.

In their first season under head coach Heron O'Neal, the Colorado Ice played their home games at the Budweiser Events Center in Loveland, Colorado. The team recorded an 8–6 record and reached the playoffs for the second season in a row. Two Ice players were named to All-IFL Teams: Aric Goodman was selected First Team for special teams and offensive lineman while Mike Trice was selected Second Team All IFL for offense.

Schedule
Key:

Regular season

Postseason

Standings

References

External links
 Colorado Ice at Loveland Reporter-Herald
 Colorado Ice official statistics
 2013 IFL regular season schedule

Colorado Ice
Colorado Crush (IFL)
Colorado Ice